Indiana is a station on the Chicago Transit Authority's 'L' system, located in Chicago, Illinois. The station serves the Green Line and the Grand Boulevard neighborhood. It is situated at 4003 S Indiana Avenue, two blocks east of State Street. It opened on August 15, 1892. Before the two lines closed, Indiana was a transfer station from the Englewood-Jackson Park Line to the Stock Yards and Kenwood branches of the CTA. Indiana is one of only two remaining 'L' stations that were built on S-curves. Sheridan on the Red Line is the other.

Bus connections 
CTA
  39 Pershing

Notes and references

Notes

References

External links
 Indiana Station Page at Chicago-L.org
 Indiana L Station @ America on the Move (Smithsonian Institute)
Indiana Avenue entrance from Google Maps Street View

CTA Green Line stations
Railway stations in the United States opened in 1892